A Arcádia e a Inconfidência is a Portuguese-language essay by Brazilian author Oswald de Andrade. It was first published in 1945.

Brazilian novels
Portuguese-language novels
1945 novels
Novels by Oswald de Andrade